Cothurus bordoni is a species of beetle in the genus Cothurus. It was described in 1987.

References

Mordellidae
Beetles described in 1987